Reginald Herbert Worsman (19 March 1933 – February 2018) was an English footballer who played as an inside forward in the Football League for Bradford Park Avenue, Bradford City and Darlington. He also played non-league football for Nelson.

References

1933 births
2018 deaths
Footballers from Bradford
English footballers
Association football inside forwards
Bradford (Park Avenue) A.F.C. players
Bradford City A.F.C. players
Nelson F.C. players
Darlington F.C. players
English Football League players